The Autódromo Internacional Zilmar Beux de Cascavel is an automobile racing complex located off Highway BR-277 in the city of Cascavel, Paraná, Brazil.

History 
The first races were carried out by automobiles on city streets in the 1960s, by amateurs and locals, which led to the building of a permanent location for motorsport events. In 1973 the Automóvel Clube de Cascavel circuit opened, being the third track with asphalt in the country.

The track came to host main competitions at national level. It was at the circuit that the Fórmula Truck series began. The circuit is a regular host of the Stock Car Pro Series.

Over the years, little money has been invested in the complex, which eventually caused the withdrawal of the circuit off the official calendar of major competitions. However, the circuit continued hosting many motoring and motorcycling events, including many driver training programs for drivers who acted and act in various automotive categories in Brazil and abroad.

Until 2013, the circuit also hosted the Formula 3 Sudamericana. Along with that, it also hosted the Campeonato Brasiliero de GT in 2012.

Lap records

The official fastest lap records at the Autódromo Internacional Zilmar Beux de Cascavel are listed as:

Notes

References

External links
Map and circuit history at RacingCircuits.info
Race track

Cascavel
Cascavel